Jeweler (foaled 17 January 2013) is a Japanese Thoroughbred racehorse and broodmare best known for her win in the 2016 Oka Sho. She won her only start as a juvenile in 2015 and emerged as a top-class performer in the following spring. After finishing a close second in two Grade 3 events she took the Oka Sho, beating Sinhalite by a nose in a photo-finish. She made only two more appearances, running unplaced in the Rose Stakes and finishing a close fourth in the Shuka Sho.

Background
Jeweler is a bay mare with a large white star bred in Japan by Shadai Farm. During her racing career she carried the blue and white colours of Yoichi Aoyama and was trained by Kenichi Fujioka. She was ridden in most of her races by the Italian jockey Mirco Demuro.

She was from the first crop of foals sired by Victoire Pisa, whose wins included the Satsuki Shō, Arima Kinen and Dubai World Cup. Jeweler's dam showed high-class form in Europe, winning three of her eight races including the Prix Penelope in 2001. After being exported to Japan she became a successful broodmare whose other foal have included the multiple Grade 3 winner One Carat. She was a female-line descendant of the French broodmare Brescia (foaled 1953) who has been the ancestor of many major winners including Anabaa.

Racing career

2015: two-year-old season
On 29 November 2015 Jeweler began her track career in a contest for previously unraced juveniles at Kyoto Racecourse. Racing over 1800 metres on firm ground she won from Admire Kizuna and thirteen others.

2016: three-year-old season

On her three-year-old debut Jeweler was matched against male opposition in the Grade 3 Shinzan Kinen over 1600 metres at Kyoto on 10 January. Starting the 3.1/1 second favourite in a fifteen-runner field she finished second to the colt Logi Cry, beaten a neck by the winner. On 5 March she started favourite the Grade 3 Tulip Sho (a major trial race for the Oka Sho) over 1600 metres at Hanshin Racecourse. After leading in the straight she was caught on the line by the fast-finishing Sinhalite and beaten a nose, the smallest possible official margin. Kenichi Fujioka said that the filly had run well after her two-month layoff and added that he felt that she had been "targeted" by the jockeys of the other runners.

In the Oka Sho at the same track on 10 April the filly started 4/1 third choice in the betting behind the 2015 juvenile champion Major Emblem with Sinhalite being made the second favourite. The other fifteen runners, none of whom started at less than 20/1 included Solveig (Fillies' Revue), Blanc Bonheur (Hakodate Nisai Stakes) and Denko Ange (Artemis Stakes). After racing at the rear of the field in the early stages Jeweler was switched to the wide outside on the final turn and began to make rapid progress in the straight. She reeled in the leaders with a sustained run, caught Sinhalite in the final stride and won by a nose with At The Seaside and Major Emblem in third and fourth. Fujioka commented "Her conformation tells us that she should suit longer distances so I have high hopes for her to do well in the remaining two legs of the Fillies’ Triple Crown".

Jeweler missed the Yushun Himba through injury and was off the course for more than five months before returning for the Rose Stakes (a major trial for the Shuka Sho) over 1800 metres at Hanshin on 18 September. She started second favourite but ran poorly and came home eleventh of the fifteen runners behind Sinhalite after which both her trainer and jockey suggested that she had bee unsuited by the prevailing heavy ground. In the Shuka Sho at Kyoto Racecourse in October she produced a much better effort as she finished strongly to take fourth place behind Vivlos, beaten just over a length by the winner.

Assessment and awards
In the JRA Awards for 2016 Jeweler finished third behind Sinhalite in the voting for the JRA Award for Best Three-Year-Old Filly.

Pedigree

References

2013 racehorse births
Racehorses bred in Japan
Racehorses trained in Japan
Thoroughbred family 1-n